The Bradenton Growers were a professional baseball team based in Bradenton, Florida. The ballclub was founded by team president and majority owner Robert M. Beall, Sr., founder of the department store Bealls.

Notable players
Many of the Growers rosters include players' names with question marks, last names only, and no dates of birth or hometowns. However, several notable Growers did make it into the majors. Logan Drake played from - as a relief pitcher for the Cleveland Indians. Walter Cleveland "Lefty" Stewart played 10 seasons in the majors for the Detroit Tigers, St. Louis Browns, Washington Senators, and Cleveland Indians. He also pitched in game 1 of the 1933 World Series for the Senators. Another Grower, Gene Elliott, played for New York Highlanders in  before playing in Bradenton. He would go on to win the 1928 World Series, as a member of the New York Yankees. Other major leaguers include Joe Buskey and Al Niehaus, Mike Kelly and Dixie Parker.

Uniforms

They wore short-billed caps and their white uniforms bore an elegant B over their hearts. While the primary color of the Growers' uniforms is not known, baseball historians from the Manatee Adult Baseball League feel that the color of the  uniforms was green and that their design was based the design on the uniforms worn by the 1919 University of Miami baseball team.

Legacy
The Growers would be the last Florida State League team based in Bradenton. The city would not be home to another FSL team for the next 84 years. Finally on April 8, the Bradenton Marauders, the High-A affiliate of the Pittsburgh Pirates, began play at McKechnie Field. On June 28, members of the Manatee Adult Baseball League, dressed in Growers uniforms for a game at Tropicana Field following a between the Tampa Bay Rays and Florida Marlins. On May 31, 2012, the Bradenton Marauders dressed on Growers uniforms during a 2–1 win over the Fort Myers Miracle for Turn Back the Clock Night at McKechnie Field.

Season-by-season

References

1919 establishments in Florida
1926 disestablishments in Florida
Defunct Florida State League teams
Defunct baseball teams in Florida
Baseball teams established in 1919
Sports clubs disestablished in 1926
Sports in Bradenton, Florida
Baseball teams disestablished in 1926